Lir-e Shamlek (also Romanized as Līr-e Shamlek; also known as Līr) is a village in Milas Rural District, in the Central District of Lordegan County, Chaharmahal and Bakhtiari Province, Iran. At the 2006 census, its population was 31, in 8 families.

References 

Populated places in Lordegan County